The Regulatory News Service (RNS) transmits regulatory and non-regulatory information published by companies and organisations allowing them to comply with local market transparency legislation.
It is owned by the London Stock Exchange and distributes over 70% of UK company news and results announcements and over 40% of the United States Securities and Exchange Commission (SEC) filings on behalf of FTSE 100 companies, amounting to over 1,000 announcements a day.

References

External links
Official RNS website

Works about business
Financial news agencies
London Stock Exchange
News agencies based in the United Kingdom